The 1909–10 season was Madrid Football Club's 8th season in existence. The club played some friendly matches against local clubs. They also played in the Campeonato Regional de Madrid (Madrid Regional Championship) and the Copa del Rey.

Arthur Johnson was appointed as manager of Madrid FC in 1910 becoming the first manager in the club's history.

Friendlies

Copa Rodriguez Arzuaga

Competitions

Overview

Campeonato Regional de Madrid

League table

Matches

Copa del Rey

References

Notes

External links
Realmadrid.com Official Site

Real Madrid
Real Madrid CF seasons